Ardabil Bazaar is a bazaar built during Safavid dynasty in Ardabil, north-western Iran.

In the 4th century historians described the bazaar as a building in the shape of the cross with a domed ceiling.  It was constructed during the Safavid dynasty from the 16th to 18th century and renovated through the Zand dynasty in the 18th century.

In and around the Ardabil Bazaar are many caravansaries and inns, owned by the estate of the Safavid dynasty shrine, and mosques, some of which were endowed by  Ata-Malik Juvayni (1226–1283) for the Shaykh Safi shrine. The proceeds from the many shops, bathhouses and inns in the bazaar that are owned by the estate of the shrine are used for the shrines upkeep.

References

Buildings and structures in Ardabil
Safavid Iran
Bazaars in Iran